Salih Aydın (born 25 October 1997) is a Turkish Greco-Roman wrestler. He is a silver medalist at the 2020 Individual Wrestling World Cup.

Career 

Salih Ahmet Aydın clinches silver medal in men's Greco-Roman 82 kg at 2020 Individual World Cup.

References

External links
 

Living people
Place of birth missing (living people)
Turkish male sport wrestlers
1997 births
Sportspeople from Rize
20th-century Turkish people
21st-century Turkish people